Jablonec nad Nisou is a city in the Liberec Region of the Czech Republic. It has about 45,000 inhabitants. It is the second-largest city in the region. It is a local centre for education, and is known for its glass and jewelry production. The town centre is well preserved and is protected by law as an urban monument zone.

Administrative parts
Jablonec nad Nisou is made up by eight city parts: Jablonec nad Nisou, Jablonecké Paseky, Kokonín, Lukášov, Mšeno nad Nisou, Proseč nad Nisou, Rýnovice and Vrkoslavice.

Etymology
The name Jablonec is of Czech origin and means "little apple tree" (jablonče was a diminutive of the old Czech jabloň – "apple tree"), for the village was founded on a place where an apple tree grew. German-speaking settlers who came to the village during the 16th century adjusted the name to Gablonz. During the 19th century, the attribute "German" was often added to the name (like in the 1848). In 1904, the official attribute in both Czech and German became "on the Neisse", which described the location of the town upon the river Lusatian Neisse.

After the war, the expelled German-speaking citizens of Jablonec founded a new settlement in Bavaria and called in remembrance of their hometown Neugablonz ("New Jablonec"). Today, it is one of the districts of the city of Kaufbeuren.

Geography

Most of the built-up area lies in the eastern tip of the Zittau Basin, and it is surrounded with the Jizera Mountains in the north, east and south. The northern part of the municipal territory also belongs into the Jizera Mountains Protected Landscape Area.

Jablonec nad Nisou is situated at the confluence of the rivers Lusatian Neisse and Bílá Nisa. The Mšeno Dam in the city belongs to the largest inner city areas in Europe.

History
The village of Jablonec was first mentioned in a Latin document from 1356 (in nouo Jablonecz). According to this document, Jablonec was founded in the 14th century. In August 1469, the village was burnt to the ground by troops of rebelling Lusatians in the war between them and King George of Poděbrady. The village was then resettled during the 16th century by mostly German-speaking colonists.

In the 18th century, the first artificial jewellery was produced and the first exporter, J. F. Schwan, spread the town's name throughout Europe. The village of Gablonz was declared a market town by Emperor Francis II on 21 April 1808 and was given town status by Emperor Franz Joseph I on 28 March 1866.

In the 19th century, the town became prosperous and wealthy, as Gablonz traders seized the foreign markets. A steady supply of a wide range of glass and artificial jewellery products flowed out of the town. This industrial advancement also improved the quality of life, and Jablonec's appearance changed dramatically.

Historian Peter Hinks, writing about the various types of Late Victorian jewellery sold by British and American companies at the turn of the 20th century, noted that "The Bohemian garnet jewellery sold by Moore and Evans [in Chicago] was the product of an industry based in the town of Gablonz, now Jablonec. These very effective jewels were set with locally mined garnets, rose cut and set in gold mounts of very formal design.".

However, the worldwide economic crisis resulting from the Wall Street Crash of 1929 damaged the glass and jewellery industry and the crisis of the 1930s with its unemployment and hunger led to great support of Nazis. In October 1938, Gablonz was occupied by Nazi Germany after the Munich Agreement, and was administered as a part of Reichsgau Sudetenland until 1945. Before 1938, the population of Gablonz was composed of 86% German inhabitants, and the rest Czechs, Jews and many other groups. In autumn 1938, most of the Jews, Czechs and anti-Nazi Germans escaped to other parts of Czechoslovakia and the Jewish synagogue was burned down. In May 1945, the town was liberated by the underground anti-Nazi groups together with some 700 French and Italian soldiers who were captives in Gablonz's camps.

Between 1945 and 1949, most of the Germans were expelled under the terms of Beneš decrees. However, a few thousand Germans who were active in struggle against the Nazi rule, Germans who had married Czechs, and Germans with special permits were allowed to stay home in Gablonz. Despite assimilation and emigration to Germany in 1968, the German minority in Gablonz still exists (there are some 1,000–2,000 in the town). Except for original Czech and Jewish Gablonz residents who returned to the area, many of the new Czech inhabitants of Gablonz came from nearby Czech towns and villages. Gablonz has also an important Greek minority, founded by communist refugees of the Greek Civil War in 1949, and a minority of Roma. Some Germans expelled from Gablonz and its surroundings founded the quarter of Neugablonz near Kaufbeuren in Bavaria and a group in Enns in Upper Austria after 1950.

Demographics

Economy
Jablonec nad Nisou holds the Czech Mint after Czechoslovakia split into the Czech Republic and Slovakia (the Czechoslovakian mint, also known as the Kremnica Mint, is now in Slovakia).

The city has a long tradition of costume jewelry and beads production.

The biggest industrial employers with headquarters in the city are Preciosa (glass products manufacturer) are TI Automotive AC (production of car air conditioners).

Transport
Jablonec shares the tramway line which connects it to its neighbouring city, Liberec. Koleje Dolnośląskie D21 line runs from Liberec to Szklarska Poręba via the town.

Sport
Jablonec has a swimming pool, three football and athletic stadiums, and an ice hockey arena.

The city is nowadays represented by FK Jablonec in the Czech First League.

Before the World War II, a number of ethnic German football clubs existed in Gablonz, Fortuna, DSK and BSK. These were merged into NSTG Gablonz in 1939 by the Nazis, NSTG standing for Nationalsozialistische Turngemeinde. NSTG played in the Gauliga Sudetenland but disappeared with the end of the war. BSK however was reformed in 1950 in Bavaria, under the name of BSK Neugablonz.

Sights

The historical city centre is formed by squares Dolní, Mírové, Horní, and Anenské, which lies close to each other, and their surroundings. The city hall, called New Town Hall, is located on Mírové Square and is a functionalistic building from 1931–1933. The Old Town Hall on Dolní Square is a building from 1867–1869 with a typical square tower. Today it serves as a library.

There are several churches in the city: Church of Saint Anne (a Baroque building from 1865–1867), Church of the Most Sacred Heart of Jesus (a brick building from 1930–1931), Church of the Exaltation of the Holy Cross (an Art Nouveau style building from 1900–1902, one of the most important sacral Art Nouveau buildings in Europe), and Protestant Dr. Farský Church (a pseudo-Gothic building from 1892).

The tradition of costume jewellery production is presented in the Museum of Glass and Costume Jewellery. It was founded in 1904 and it is located in an Art Nouveau building.

Notable people

Adolf Benda (1845–1878), historian
Gustav Leutelt (1860–1947), writer and poet
Reinhold Hanisch (1882–1937), business partner of Adolf Hitler in Vienna, 1910
Konrad Henlein (1898–1945), Nazi politician
Peter Herman Adler (1899–1990), conductor
Ute de Lange Nilsen (born 1931), Czech-Norwegian artist
Jiří Moskal (born 1949), rally raid driver
Ivan Bartoš (born 1980), politician
Jakub Čutta (born 1981), ice hockey player
Barbora Špotáková (born 1981), javelin thrower
Radka Vodičková (born 1984), triathlete
Daniel Špaček (born 1986), ice hockey player
Gabriela Koukalová (born 1989), biathlete
Jessica Jislová (born 1994), biathlete
Markéta Davidová (born 1997), biathlete

Twin towns – sister cities

Jablonec nad Nisou is twinned with:

 Bautzen, Germany
 Beihai, China
 Jelenia Góra, Poland
 Kaufbeuren, Germany
 Marsciano, Italy
 Ronse, Belgium
 Zwickau, Germany

References

External links

Official tourist portal
Old postcards 

Cities and towns in the Czech Republic
Populated places in Jablonec nad Nisou District